Agua means water in Spanish.

Agua may also refer to:

Places
 Agua de Dios (God's water), a municipality in Colombia
 Volcán de Agua, a stratovolcano located in Guatemala

Arts, entertainment, and media
 Agua (film), a 2006 Argentine and French sports drama film
 "Agua" (Tainy and J Balvin song), 2020
 Agua (Daddy Yankee song), 2022
 "Agua", a 2018 song by Saweetie from High Maintenance
 "Água de Beber", a song by Antônio Carlos Jobim and Vinicius de Moraes

See also
 Águas